Olmedo Sáenz Sánchez (born October 8, 1970) is a Panamanian former Major League Baseball player. Though primarily a pinch hitter, he occasionally played first base or third base.

Professional career

Chicago White Sox
His minor league career in the White Sox organization (1991-) also included stops with the Single-A Sarasota White Sox, Double-A Birmingham Barons, Triple-A Nashville Sounds and the Triple-A Calgary Cannons. He missed most of the  season because of a torn achilles tendon suffered in spring training.

He got one hit in three at bats in that game, collecting his first hit in the third inning against Ben McDonald. He had 2 hits in 14 at-bats during the five games he spent on the White Sox roster before returning to Nashville.

Oakland Athletics
Released by the White Sox, Sáenz signed as a free agent with the Oakland Athletics on November 13, 1998, and made the Athletics opening day roster. He was used primarily as a designated hitter during his four seasons with Oakland, getting occasional playing time at either 1st or 3rd.

Los Angeles Dodgers
A question mark because of his injury history, Sáenz was not retained by the A's and wound up attending spring training with the Los Angeles Dodgers as a non-roster invitee, earning a spot on their roster as the primary right-handed pinch hitter. He was part of Major League history when, on September 8, 2004, he hit a pinch-hit grand slam homer, marking the first time in MLB history that a team had a pinch-hit grand slam in back-to-back games, as Robin Ventura hit one on September 7. His best year came in 2005, when he set a career high in almost every offensive category including home runs (15) and RBI (63). He also had a solid 2006 season when he hit for a batting average of .296 with 11 home runs and 48 RBI.

He was one of the Dodgers' most consistent players coming off the bench during his time in Los Angeles. Sáenz became well known as being a dead fastball hitter, a skill upon which Vin Scully remarked at virtually every one of Saenz's plate appearances. He rarely played in the field, making only an occasional start at either first or third base. He earned the nickname "The Killer Tomato" from Dodger fans and commentators.

New York Mets
His tenure with the Dodgers ended when he filed for free agency on October 11, . On February 12, Sáenz signed a minor league deal with the New York Mets and was invited to spring training.  He failed to make the roster and retired.

World Baseball Classic

Coaching career
He was previously the hitting coach for the Great Falls Voyagers of the Pioneer League.

Personal life
Sáenz and his wife, Sylvia, have a son, Juan Carlos and daughter, Jaquelyn. He owns a ranch in his native Panama.

References

External links

Retrosheet
Venezuelan Professional Baseball League

1970 births
Living people
Arizona League Athletics players
Birmingham Barons players
Calgary Cannons players
Caribes de Oriente players
Chicago White Sox players
Gulf Coast White Sox players
Los Angeles Dodgers players
Major League Baseball first basemen
Major League Baseball players from Panama
Major League Baseball third basemen
Minor league baseball coaches
Modesto A's players
Nashville Sounds players
Oakland Athletics players
Panamanian expatriate baseball players in Canada
Panamanian expatriate baseball players in the United States
Panamanian sports coaches
Pastora de Occidente players
People from Chitré
Sacramento River Cats players
Sarasota White Sox players
South Bend White Sox players
Tiburones de La Guaira players
Panamanian expatriate baseball players in Venezuela
Vancouver Canadians players
2006 World Baseball Classic players